The Yorkshire Cricket Board is the governing body for all recreational cricket in the historic county of Yorkshire.

From 1999 to 2003 the Board fielded a team in the English domestic one-day tournament, matches which had List A status.

See also
List of Yorkshire Cricket Board List A players

References

External links
 Yorkshire Cricket Board

County Cricket Boards
Cricket in Yorkshire
Cricket